Agulsky District  is an administrative and municipal district (raion), one of the forty-one in the Republic of Dagestan, Russia. It is located in the south of the republic. Its administrative center is the rural locality (a selo) of Tpig. As of the 2010 Census, the total population of the district was 11,204, with the population of Tpig accounting for 24.4% of that number.

Administrative and municipal status
Within the framework of administrative divisions, Agulsky District is one of the forty-one in the Republic of Dagestan. The district is divided into six selsoviets which comprise nineteen rural localities.  As a municipal division, the district is incorporated as Agulsky Municipal District. Its six selsoviets are incorporated as ten rural settlements within the municipal district. The selo of Tpig serves as the administrative center of both the administrative and municipal district.

References

Notes

Sources

Districts of Dagestan
